The Nevada general election, 2018 was held on Tuesday, November 6, 2018 throughout Nevada.

United States Senate

Incumbent Republican U.S. Senator Dean Heller ran for re-election to a second term but lost to Democratic U.S. Representative Jacky Rosen.

United States House of Representatives

All of Nevada's four seats in the United States House of Representatives were up for election in 2018.

Governor

Incumbent Republican Governor Brian Sandoval was term-limited for life and could not run for re-election to a third term in office.

Lieutenant governor
Incumbent Republican Lieutenant Governor Mark Hutchison did not run for re-election to a second term.

Republican primary

Candidates

Declared
Eugene Hoover, businessman
Brent Jones, former state assemblyman (2014–2016)
Scott LaFata, consulting services provider
Gary Meyers, businessman
Michael Roberson, minority leader of the Nevada Senate

Declined
Mark Hutchison, incumbent Lieutenant Governor

Results

Democratic primary

Candidates
Laurie Hansen
Kate Marshall, former Nevada State Treasurer (2007–2015) and nominee for Nevada Secretary of State in 2014

Results

General election

Polling

Results

Attorney general

Incumbent Republican Attorney General Adam Laxalt did not run for re-election to a second term and instead ran unsuccessfully for governor.

Republican primary

Candidates

Declared
Wesley Duncan, assistant Nevada Attorney General
Craig Mueller, lawyer and former U.S. Naval officer

Declined
Mark Amodei, incumbent U.S. Representative for Nevada's 2nd congressional district 
Adam Laxalt, incumbent Nevada Attorney General

Results

Democratic primary

Candidates

Declared
 Aaron Ford, majority leader of the Nevada Senate
Stuart MacKie

Declined
 Steve Wolfson, Clark County District Attorney (ran for re-election and won)

Results

General election

Polling

Results

Secretary of State
Incumbent Republican Secretary of State Barbara Cegavske ran for re-election to a second term.

Republican primary

Candidates

Declared
Ernest Aldridge
Barbara Cegavske, incumbent Nevada Secretary of State

Results

Democratic primary

Candidates

Declared
 Nelson Araujo, state assemblyman

Declined
Kelvin Atkinson, state senator
 Oscar Delgado, Reno city councilman
Pat Spearman, state senator

General election

Predictions

Polling

Results

Treasurer
Incumbent Republican State Treasurer Dan Schwartz did not run for re-election to a second term and instead ran unsuccessfully for governor.

Democratic primary

Candidates

Declared
Zach Conine, businessman

Declined
Andrew Martin, former state assemblyman (2013–2015) and nominee for Nevada State Controller in 2014 Nevada elections#Controller
Irene Bustamante Adams, state assemblywoman
Teresa Benitez-Thompson, state assemblywoman

Republican primary

Candidates

Declared
Bob Beers, Las Vegas city councilman (2012–2017), former state senator (2004–2008), and former state assemblyman (1998–2004)
Derek Uehara, certified financial planner and former candidate for Henderson City Council

Results

General election

Results

Controller
Incumbent Republican Controller Ron Knecht lost re-election to a second term.

Republican primary

Candidates

Declared
Ron Knecht, incumbent Nevada State Controller

Democratic primary

Candidates

Declared
Catherine Byrne, accountant

Declined
Andrew Martin, former state assemblyman (2013–2015) and nominee for Nevada State Controller in 2014 Nevada elections#Controller

General election

Results

State Legislature

Nevada Senate

Eleven out of twenty-one seats in the Nevada Senate were up for election in 2018.

Nevada Assembly

All 42 seats in the Nevada Assembly were up for election in 2018.

State Judicial Branch

Supreme Court Seat C
Incumbent Justice Michael Cherry, who has served on the Nevada Supreme Court since 2007, did not run for re-election to a third term.

Candidates
Elissa Cadish, Clark County District Judge 
Jerry Tao, Court of Appeals Judge 
Alan Lefebvre, Las Vegas attorney 
Leon Aberasturi, Lyon County District Judge 
John Rutledge, Carson City attorney who unsuccessfully ran for governor as a Democrat in 2014

Supreme Court Seat F
Incumbent Justice Michael L. Douglas, who has served on the Nevada Supreme Court since 2004, pledged to retire in January 2019.

Court of Appeals Chief Judge Abbi Silver ran for the seat unopposed.

Supreme Court Seat G
Incumbent Justice Lidia S. Stiglich, who has served on the Nevada Supreme Court since 2017, was eligible to run for a first full term.

References

External links
Candidates at Vote Smart 
Candidates at Ballotpedia
Campaign finance at OpenSecrets

Official Lieutenant Governor campaign websites
Janine Hansen (IAPN) for Lt. Governor
Kate Marshall (D) for Lt. Governor
Michael Roberson (R) for Lt. Governor
Ed Uehling (NPP) for Lt. Governor

Official Attorney General campaign websites
Wesley Duncan (R) for Attorney General
Aaron Ford (D) for Attorney General

Official Secretary of State campaign websites
Nelson Araujo (D) for Secretary of State
Barbara Cegavske (R) for Secretary of State

Official State Treasurer campaign websites
Bob Beers (R) for Treasurer
Zach Conine (D) for Treasurer

Official State Controller campaign websites
Catherine Byrne (D) for Controller
Ron Knecht (R) for Controller 

 
Nevada